Xylosyltransferase are transferase enzymes which act upon xylose and are classified under EC 2.4.2.

More specifically, they can refer to:
 Dolichyl-phosphate D-xylosyltransferase
 Dolichyl-xylosyl-phosphate-protein xylosyltransferase
 Flavonol-3-O-glycoside xylosyltransferase
 Glycoprotein 2-beta-D-xylosyltransferase
 Protein xylosyltransferase
 Xyloglucan 6-xylosyltransferase
 XYLT1
 XYLT2
 Zeatin O-beta-D-xylosyltransferase

xylosyl transferase is the first enzyme involved in the biosynthesis of glycosaminoglycan chains, an important constituent of proteoglycans. There are two types of xylosyl transferases type I and type II.

EC 2.4.2